Antoine Serlom Semenyo (born 7 January 2000) is a professional footballer who plays as a striker for Premier League side AFC Bournemouth and the Ghana national team.

Club career

Bristol City
In 2017, Semenyo signed for Bristol City, after impressing for South Gloucestershire and Stroud College's football academy. Semenyo made his Bristol City debut on the final day of the 2017–18 season coming on as a second-half substitute for Lloyd Kelly in the 3–2 loss to Sheffield United at Ashton Gate. Semenyo was allocated shirt number 18 for Bristol City and he was named as a substitute for the Championship away match against Blackburn Rovers on 9 February 2019. On 27 April 2019, Semenyo controversially received his first career red card against Derby County for a challenge on Tom Huddlestone. In June 2019, he signed a new four-year contract with the club. On 5 September 2020 he scored his first goal for Bristol City in an EFL Cup tie against Exeter City. 
Semenyo played consistently for Bristol City in the 2020–21 season playing fifty competitive games also scoring five and assisting seven goals.

Semenyo won the EFL Championship Player of the Month award for January 2022 after scoring three goals and getting three assists. He finished the season with 8 goals and 12 assists in 32 games in all competitions, the best season of his career so far.

Newport County (loan)
On 18 July 2018, Semenyo joined Newport County on loan until the end of the 2018–19 season. He made his Newport debut in a 3–0 defeat against Mansfield Town on 4 August 2018 as a second-half substitute. On 14 August 2018, he scored his first goal for Newport in a 4–1 win over Cambridge United in the EFL Cup.

He was recalled by Bristol City on 28 January 2019.

Sunderland (loan)
On January deadline day 2020, Semenyo joined League One side Sunderland on a sixth-month loan deal until the end of the 2019–20 season.

AFC Bournemouth
On 27 January 2023, AFC Bournemouth completed a deal worth £10 million for Semenyo on a four-and-a-half-year deal.

International career
Born in England, Semenyo is of Ghanaian descent. He debuted with the Ghana national team in a 3–0 2023 Africa Cup of Nations qualification win over Madagascar on 1 June 2022. On 14 November 2022, Semenyo was included in Ghana's 26-man squad for the 2022 World Cup in Qatar.

Personal life
Semenyo's father, Larry, is a former footballer, having played as a midfielder for Okwawu United in the Ghana Premier League.

Career statistics

Club

International

Scores and results list Ghana's goal tally first, score column indicates score after each Semenyo goal.

Honours 
Individual

 EFL Championship Player of the Month: January 2022
 Bristol City Young Player of the Year: 2021–22

References

External links
Profile at the AFC Bournemouth website

2000 births
Living people
Footballers from Greater London
Citizens of Ghana through descent
Ghanaian footballers
Ghana international footballers
English footballers
English sportspeople of Ghanaian descent
Association football defenders
Bristol City F.C. players
Bath City F.C. players
Newport County A.F.C. players
Sunderland A.F.C. players
Black British sportspeople
National League (English football) players
English Football League players
2022 FIFA World Cup players